The LADA VFTS is a rally car based on the Lada 2105. Lada is a trademark of the Russian manufacturer AvtoVAZ. VFTS stands for Vilniusskaja fabrika transportnych sredstv (in Cyrrilic: Вильнюсская фабрика транспортных средств), Russian for "Vilnius factory of vehicles".

VFTS started as a workshop at Vilnius car repair factory and later transformed into Vilnius factory of vehicles - company which specialized in a preparation of rally/race versions of Lada vehicles and engines. Best known for the Lada 2105 rally vehicle version prepared under Group B rules. The company was founded and managed by famous Lithuanian rally driver Stasys Brundza.

History 

The preparation of rally cars started in the 1970 in Vilnius, Lithuania (then part of the Soviet Union) in one of halls of Vilnius car repair factory. First model produced in Vilnius factory was Lada 1300 with the engine enlarged up to 1600cc and tuned to 130-150 HP.

 1978: "Lada-1600 Rally" model was presented
 1982.10.01: "LADA VFTS" received FIA homologation
 
 1985-1988: company developed mid-engine rally car under Group B rules "Lada-2108 EVA Turbo" with 1860 cc, 16 valve, turbo 270-300 HP engine. The VFTS soon became very popular among race drivers and rally fans. It was highly advertised and there was even a leaflet translated to English.
 1988: company became fully independent and renamed "Eksperimentinė sportinių automobilių gamykla" - in English EVA ("Experimental Vilnius Auto-plant").

Number of exported original vehicles:
 1979: 2 pcs Bulgaria
 1980: 1 pc Panama, 1 pc Norway
 1981: 1 pc. Norway, 1 pc. Canada
 1984: 2 pcs. Cameroon
 1985: 1 pc. Austria, 1 pc. Norway, 1 pc. Bulgaria
 1986: 1 pc. Panama, 2 pcs. Jordan, 1 pc. Norway, 2 pcs. Finland, 2 pcs. Spain
 1987: 1 pc. Finland, 1pc. Panama, 1 pc. Hungary
 1990: 4 pcs Czechoslovakia "Metalex", 1pc  Germany

In total: 30 vehicles

Head engineers and technicians at company were Zbignevas Kivertas (engine), Henrikas Šilinis, Vygandas Ulickas, Arūnas Volungevičius (design of Lada 2108 EVA).

However, after ban of the Group B cars the production did not last for long. As the Soviet Union abolished the production of these cars various rally drivers started to copy VFTS design and technical solutions. LADA-VFTS became very popular in Hungary. Lada VFTS cars reappeared in the H class of the Hungarian championship at the end of the 1990s. Nowadays, this car is very popular among rally drivers in ex-Soviet and other European countries. For example, Russian rally drivers use these cars in Club Rally Series, also in short Rally-Sprints series. They build replicas of VFTS cars and are showing results that are better than with other newer rally cars.

Appearance 

The car's mudguards are angularly broadened which gives the car's characteristic appearance. This modification was not merely about design it was necessary because of the car's widened wheels. Spoilers are also used.

Construction 

The most important factor during the creation of a Lada VFTS was to reduce total weight. To achieve weight of 920–950 kg different materials are used such as plexi glass or polycarbonate instead of glass. As this car was designed for races there were many changes comparing to the Lada 2105 that gives its brakes and bodywork to the complete racecar. Many parts of the VFTS are strengthened in order to improve driving stability, cornering, grip and handling.

Lada VFTS is a rear-wheel drive car. However, during its development many things were changed. The brake system remained the same that was used on production vehicles from the Soviet factory. Disk brakes are used on the front axle while drum brakes are used on the rear.

The engine is different from the original one. There's a high-efficiency engine in it that has higher petrol consumption. 100 octane fuel is used in these race cars. Many things are transferred or removed from the engine compartment to make it easier to repair and to get rid of the unnecessary elements such as the air filter.
The structural and electronical changes in Lada VFTS cars result in 160-180 HP compared to only 75 HP in the standard model 2105.
The body is also strengthened in order to make the car suitable for race adversities. The axle housing was heavily fortified.
A single-row gearshift that is different from the usual one is used in this car that produces the characteristic sound of these cars. Due to the modifications there were also changes in the places of each gear as a result of lack of space.
The cabin is also converted. Roll over cage is added. There are only two bucket seats with 4-point seat belts.
The dashboard is also reorganized to make the contingent repairs easier and faster.

References

External links 
 Lada VFTS exterior, interior and engine live view video 
 Road and Track article

VFTS
VFTS
VFTS